Roberto Casone (born 13 February 1951 in Suardi) is an Italian professional football coach former of Arenzano and a former player, who played as a midfielder.

Career

Player 
He has played 4 seasons (34 games, 1 goal) in the Serie A for A.C. Milan and U.C. Sampdoria.

Coach 
He has coached Vogherese, San Carlo, Casale (youth), Lomello and Arenzano

Honours
Milan
 Coppa Italia winner: 1972–73.
 UEFA Cup Winners' Cup winner: 1972–73.

External links
Casone with Milan
Casone in Italy U-21

1951 births
Living people
Italian footballers
Italy under-21 international footballers
Serie A players
A.C. Milan players
U.C. Sampdoria players
Como 1907 players
S.S. Arezzo players
Ternana Calcio players
Casale F.B.C. players
Italian football managers
A.C. Voghera managers
Association football midfielders